M. fenestrata may refer to:
 Miomantis fenestrata, a praying mantis species
 Moraea fenestrata, (Goldblatt) Goldblatt, a plant species in the genus Moraea
 Myopa fenestrata, Coquillett, 1902, a fly species in the genus Myopa

See also
 Fenestrata (disambiguation)